Statistics of Second Division Football Tournament in the 2013 season. The FAM rebranded the name of the 'Second Division Football Tournament to Enjoy Championship after the sponsor from Enjoy juice.

Teams
9 teams are competing in the 2013 Second Division Football Tournament, and these teams were divided into 2 groups.

Group stage round
From each group, the top two teams will be advanced for the league round.

Group 1
Club Green Streets and Mahibadhoo SC advanced to the league round as the top two teams of the group.

Group 2
Club Zefrol and Sports Club Mecano advanced to the league round as the top two teams of the group.

League round
The top two teams from each group will be qualified to compete in this round. As a total of four teams will be playing in this round of the tournament, the top two teams from this round will be advanced to the Final. The top two teams of this round will also play in the Playoff for 2014 Dhivehi League. Mahibadhoo SC and Sports Club Mecano claimed the first and second position to advance for the Final.

Final

Awards

Prize money

References

External links
 A draw in the opening match (DHIVEHI) at Haveeru Online
 A draw for Green Street & Mahibadhoo (DHIVEHI) at Haveeru Online
A draw for JJ & Riverside at Haveeru Online (Dhivehi)

External links

Maldivian Second Division Football Tournament seasons
Maldives
Maldives
2